The Other Side of the Moon may refer to:

The Other Side of the Moon (album), an album of rarities and B-sides by The Cardigans
The Other Side of the Moon (anthology), an anthology of science fiction stories edited by August Derleth

See also:

 Dark side of the Moon (disambiguation)